Ragnald of the Isle of Man may refer to:

 Ragnall mac Gofraid, early 11th-century King of the Isles
 Rǫgnvaldr Óláfsson (fl. 1164),  ruler of the Isle of Man for a brief period in 1164
 Rǫgnvaldr Guðrøðarson, King of the Isles 1187–1226
 Rǫgnvaldr Óláfsson (died 1249), King of the Isles for a brief period in 1249